Earl of Lauderdale is a title in the Peerage of Scotland.  The current holder of the title is Ian Maitland, 18th Earl of Lauderdale.

History
The title was created in 1624 for John Maitland, 2nd Lord Maitland of Thirlestane, Berwickshire.
The second Earl was created Duke of Lauderdale and by popular naming represented the "L" in the Cabal ministry, an acronym which amounted to the first major, perennial delegation of power from the monarch to a cabinet. When he died without male issue, the dukedom became extinct. The earldom passed to his brother Charles, 3rd Earl. Charles married, in 1652, Elizabeth, daughter of Richard Lauder of Haltoun and by this marriage came into that family's great estates.

Other titles associated with the earldom are: Viscount of Lauderdale (created 1616), Viscount of Maitland (1624), Lord Maitland of Thirlestane (1590) and Lord Thirlestane and Boulton (1624). All of these titles are in the Peerage of Scotland. The Earl of Lauderdale is the hereditary chief of Clan Maitland. The eldest son is the Master of Lauderdale. The title Viscount Maitland is sometimes used as a courtesy title for the Earl's eldest son and heir.

The Earl of Lauderdale, as Bearer for the Sovereign of the Sovereign's National Flag for Scotland, one of the Officers of the Royal Household in Scotland, has the right to bear the saltire for the Sovereign.

The historical family seat is Thirlestane Castle, near Lauder in Scotland, home of Captain  Gerald Maitland-Carew and his family. He is the eldest son of Lady Sylvia Maitland – who became wife to the 6th Baron Carew – she was the eldest of two children of the 15th Earl of Lauderdale; her brother was killed in action in North Africa, aged 27 and left three daughters. Therefore the earldom passed to a cadet branch and the castle passed down the more direct female line.

Notable wives and Maitland descendants
Elizabeth Tollemache, Countess of Dysart in her own right was (the second wife of the Duke) saw her titles and her estate of Ham House, Petersham, London (then in Surrey) pass to her son from her own previous marriage. The house is claimed by the National Trust to be "unique in Europe as the most complete survival of 17th century fashion and power."
Lieutenant-Colonel John Maitland (1732-1779) was the tenth son (eighth-surviving childhood) of the sixth Earl, active in the Battle of Stono Ferry and Siege of Savannah.
Lady Olga Maitland (1944-) is the first daughter of the seventeenth Earl and was the MP for Sutton and Cheam for one term of five years from 1992 and is a journalist.

Lords Maitland of Thirlestane (1590)
 John Maitland, 1st Lord Maitland of Thirlestane (1537–1595)
 John Maitland, 2nd Lord Maitland of Thirlestane (died 1645), created Earl of Lauderdale in 1624

Earls of Lauderdale (1624)
 John Maitland, 1st Earl of Lauderdale (same person as above)
 John Maitland, 2nd Earl of Lauderdale (1616–1682), created Duke of Lauderdale in 1672

Duke of Lauderdale  (1672)
also created Earl of Guilford and Baron Petersham in the Peerage of England in 1674
 John Maitland, 1st Duke of Lauderdale (same person as above)
All three titles created for him became extinct upon his death.

Earls of Lauderdale (1624; reverted)
 Charles Maitland, 3rd Earl of Lauderdale (died 1691); 2nd son of the 1st Earl; brother of the 2nd Earl (1st Duke of Lauderdale)
 Richard Maitland, 4th Earl of Lauderdale (died 1695); eldest surviving son of the 3rd Earl
 John Lauder or Maitland, 5th Earl of Lauderdale (died 1710); 2nd surviving son  of the 3rd Earl
 Hon. James Maitland, Visccount Maitland (c. 1680 – 1709); eldest son of the 5th Earl, died without male issue
 Charles Maitland, 6th Earl of Lauderdale (c. 1688 – 1744); 2nd son of the 5th Earl 
 James Maitland, 7th Earl of Lauderdale (1718–1789); eldest son of the 6th Earl
 Hon. Valdave Charles Lauder Maitland, Viscount Maitland (1752–1754); eldest son of the 7th Earl
 James Maitland, 8th Earl of Lauderdale (1759–1839); eldest surviving son of the 7th Earl 
 James Maitland, 9th Earl of Lauderdale (1784–1860); eldest son of the 8th Earl
 Anthony Maitland, 10th Earl of Lauderdale (1785–1863); 2nd son of the 8th Earl
 Col. Hon. John Maitland (1789–1839); 3rd son of the 8th Earl, died without issue
 Hon. Charles James Fox Maitland (1793–1817); 4th and youngest son of the 8th Earl
 Lt. Gen. Rt Hon Sir Thomas Maitland (died 1824); 3rd son of the 7th Earl
 Gen. Hon William Mordaunt Maitland (1841); 4th and youngest son of the 7th Earl
 Thomas Maitland, 11th Earl of Lauderdale (1803–1878); only son of Gen. Hon. William Mordaunt Maitland, grandson of the 7th Earl; cousin of the 10th Earl
 Hon. Charles Maitland later Barclay-Maitland (died 1795); 2nd son of the 6th Earl
 Charles Barclay-Maitland of Tillcoutry (died 1818); son of Hon. Charles Barclay-Maitland
 Rev. Charles Barclay-Maitland (1789–1844); son of Charles Barclay-Maitland
 Charles Barclay-Maitland, 12th Earl of Lauderdale (1822–1884); son of Rev. Charles Barclay-Maitland, great-great-grandson of the 6th Earl; second cousin once removed of the 11th Earl
 Alexander Barclay-Maitland (died 1794); youngest brother of Charles Barclay-Maitland of Tillcoutry
 Col. Hon. Richard Maitland (1724–1772); 3rd son of the 6th Earl
 Capt. Richard Maitland (1768–1802); eldest son of Col. Hon. Richard Maitland; died without issue
 Patrick Maitland of Kilmaron Castle (1770–1821); 2nd son of Col. Hon. Richard Maitland
 Maj. Gen. Frederick Colthurst Maitland (1808–1876); son of Patrick Maitland
 Frederick Henry Maitland, 13th Earl of Lauderdale (1840–1924); son of Maj. Gen. Frederick Colthurst Maitland, great-great grandson of the 6th Earl; 3rd cousin of the 12th Earl
 Frederick Colin Maitland, 14th Earl of Lauderdale (1868–1931); eldest son of the 13th Earl
 Ian Colin Maitland, 15th Earl of Lauderdale (1891–1953); eldest son of the 14th Earl
 Hon. Ivor Colin James Maitland, Viscount Maitland (1915–1943), only son of the 15th Earl, killed in action in World War II at Africa, died without male issue
 Rev. Hon. Sydney George William Maitland (1869–1946); 2nd son of the 13th Earl
 Alfred Sydney Frederick Maitland, 16th Earl of Lauderdale (1904–1968); eldest son of Rev. Hon. Sydney George William Maitland; grandson of the 13th Earl. Maitland died under mysterious circumstances; three days after he disappeared on 24 November 1968 his body washed up on a beach at Angmering in Sussex, England. "Scotland's Flag Bearer Found Dead", Pittsburgh Post-Gazette, 29 November 1968, p2
 Patrick Francis Maitland, 17th Earl of Lauderdale (1911–2008); 2nd son of Rev. Hon. Sydney George William Maitland; grandson of the 13th Earl; brother of the 16th Earl
 Ian Maitland, 18th Earl of Lauderdale (b. 1937); eldest son of the 17th Earl

The heir apparent is the present holder's son, John Douglas Maitland, Viscount Maitland (b. 1965). His uncle, the next in line, is the Rev. Hon. Sydney Milivoje Maitland (b. 1951). Both are childless.
Next in succession to the peerages is the line of the Maitland baronets, descended from the 5th son of the 6th earl. The presumed current baronet is Charles Alexander Maitland (born 1986), the present earl's sixth cousin twice removed (see descent below).

 Charles Maitland, 6th Earl of Lauderdale (c. 1688–1744)
Hon. Richard Maitland (1724–1772)
Patrick Maitland (1770–1821)
Frederick Colthurst Maitland (1808–1876)
 Frederick Maitland, 13th Earl of Lauderdale (1840–1924)
Sydney George William Maitland (1869–1946)
 Patrick Maitland, 17th Earl of Lauderdale (1911–2008)
 Ian Maitland, 18th Earl of Lauderdale (born 1937)(1). John Douglas Maitland, Viscount Maitland (born 1965)
(2). Hon. Sydney Milivoje Maitland (born 1951)
 Sir Alexander Maitland, 1st Baronet (1728–1820) Sir Alexander Charles Gibson-Maitland, 2nd Baronet (1755–1848)Alexander Maitland (1787–1828)George Ramsay Maitland (1821–1866) Sir John Nisbet Maitland, 5th Baronet (1850–1936) Sir George Ramsay Maitland, 7th Baronet (1882–1960) Sir Alexander Keith Maitland, 8th Baronet (1920–1963) Sir Richard John Maitland, 9th Baronet (1952–1994)(1,3). Charles Alexander Maitland, presumed 10th Baronet (born 1986)
(2,4). Robert Ramsay Maitland (born 1956)
(3,5). Harry Robert Maitland (born 1986)
(4,6). John Richard Maitland (born 1992)John Ramsay Maitland (1924–2012)(5,7). David Ramsay Maitland (born 1954)James Maitland (1957–2014)(6,8). Alexander Findlay Maitland (born 1989)
(7,9). Charles Percy Maitland (born 1991)
(8,10). Keith John Maitland (born 1969)James Maitland (1927–2016)''
(9,11). Alexander Henry Maitland (born 1964)

The simplified chart above lists those individuals in the line of succession who are nearest in consanguinity to the present earl; there are further heirs in descent from the 2nd Baronet, the 1st Baronet and from other younger sons of the 6th earl.

Arms

Notes

References

Sources

Earldoms in the Peerage of Scotland
Noble titles created in 1624